Grijota is a municipality located in the province of Palencia, Castile and León, Spain. According to the 2019 census (INE), the municipality has a population of 2,319 inhabitants.

It is 7km away from the capital of the province, Palencia, and 57km from the city of Valladolid, capital of the region of Castile and León. The municipality has a village and then groups of houses, some of the containing 100 or more neighbours. Thus, despite being located in an area affected by depopulation, it is in constant urban growth since the late 1990s. The first of them started to be built in 1999 and they have been building new ones since. Thanks to them Grijota is the ninth most populated municipality of the Province of Palencia.

References

Municipalities in the Province of Palencia